Lou D'Agostino (born December 12, 1973) is a former American football fullback. He played for the New York Jets in 1996 and for the New York/New Jersey Hitmen in 2001.

References

1973 births
Living people
American football fullbacks
Hofstra Pride football players
Rhode Island Rams football players
New York Jets players
New York/New Jersey Hitmen players